The women's 4 × 100 metres relay event at the 2019 Asian Athletics Championships was held on 23 April.

Results

References

Relay
Relays at the Asian Athletics Championships
2019 in women's athletics